The seventh season of the reality television series Love & Hip Hop: New York aired on VH1 from November 21, 2016 until February 27, 2017. The show was primarily filmed in New York City, New York. It was executively produced by Mona Scott-Young and Stephanie R. Gayle for Monami Entertainment, Toby Barraud, Stefan Springman, Mala Chapple, David DiGangi, and Josh Richards for Eastern TV, and Nina L. Diaz and Vivian Gomez for VH1.

The series chronicles the lives of several women and men in the New York area, involved in hip hop music. It consists of 16 episodes, including a two-part reunion special hosted by Nina Parker.

Production

On November 14, 2016, VH1 announced that Love & Hip Hop would be returning for a seventh season on November 21, 2016. 

Kimbella Vanderhee returned as a series regular after being absent from the show since the second season. Bianca Bonnie was promoted to the main cast, along with The Wire star Felicia "Snoop" Pearson. After a controversial storyline last season involving their duelling pregnancies, Tara and Amina were phased out of the show, appearing only as supporting cast members. One of the season's leading storylines was the violent feud between Yandy and Mendeecees' baby mamas Samantha Wallace and Erika DeShazo, as they battle for custody over Mendeecees' children. Samantha and Erika would join the supporting cast, along with Samantha's mother Kim Wallace and Mendeecees' mother Judy Harris. The season's supporting cast, the largest in the show's history so far, would also include Juelz Santana, Juju C., fiancée of Cam'ron, Snoop's girlfriend J. Adrienne, radio personality DJ Drewski and his girlfriend Sky Landish, Cardi's sister Hennessy Carolina and producer Swift Star. Singers Sofi Green and Major Galore, Rich's daughter Ashley Trowers, his girlfriend Jade Wifey and Swift's girlfriend Asia Cole appeared in minor supporting roles. Love & Hip Hop: Hollywood star Moniece Slaughter made a special crossover appearance in two episodes.

On December 30, 2016, Cardi B announced she was leaving the show to focus on her rap career.

Synopsis

With her husband Mendeecees in jail, Yandy finds herself in a custody battle with his baby mamas Samantha and Erika over their children. Kimbella struggles to move forward from Juelz's past infidelities and trust him again as he embarks on a career comeback. Cardi's fame has reached new heights but her attraction to her producer Swift creates new dramas. Bianca links up with old flame DJ Drewski, igniting a feud with his girlfriend Sky. The creep squad is torn apart after Self and Cisco get into a contract war over Mariahlynn. Snoop and her girlfriend J Adrienne come to blows over J's intense jealousy. Remy's career is better than ever but she is starting to feel the pressure from Papoose to expand their family.

Cast

Starring

 Yandy Smith-Harris (15 episodes)
 Kimbella Vanderhee (12 episodes)
 Cardi B (14 episodes)
 Bianca Bonnie (12 episodes)
 Mariahlynn (14 episodes)
 Felicia "Snoop" Pearson (13 episodes)
 Remy Ma (10 episodes)

Also starring

 Hennessy Carolina (9 episodes)
 Rich Dollaz (14 episodes)
 DJ Self (13 episodes) 
 Cisco Rosado (11 episodes)
 Samantha Wallace (11 episodes)
 Juelz Santana (11 episodes)
 J. Adrienne (13 episodes)
 Swift Star (7 episodes)
 Papoose (9 episodes)
 DJ Drewski (10 episodes)
 Sofi Green (4 episodes)
 Sky Landish (10 episodes)
 Kim Wallace (7 episodes)
 Erika DeShazo (12 episodes)
 Judy Harris (8 episodes)
 Asia Davies (3 episodes)
 Ashley Trowers (4 episodes)
 Jade Wifey (3 episodes)
 Juju C. (10 episodes)
 Moniece Slaughter (2 episodes)
 Peter Gunz (9 episodes)
 Tara Wallace (5 episodes)
 Major Galore (5 episodes)
 Amina Buddafly (3 episodes)

Nef Harris, Dejanae Mackie, Jace Smith, Miracle Kaye Hall, Jewel Escobar, Shaft, Irene Mackie, Whitney Pankey and Cory Gunz appear as guest stars in several episodes. Mendeecees Harris appears via phone call conversations with Yandy, as he was incarcerated during filming. The show also features minor appearances from notable figures within the hip hop industry and New York's social scene, including Fat Joe, French Montana, Sisterhood of Hip Hops Nyemiah Supreme, Cam'ron, Vado, Method Man, Lil Durk, Noreaga, Konshens, Red Café and Michael K. Williams.

The show features cameo appearances from the cast's children, including Kimbella and Juelz' children Leandro, Juelz and Bella James, Mendeeces's children Lil Mendeecees, Aasim, Omere and Skylar Harris, and Peter's children Jamison, Kaz, Cori, Gunner and Bronx Pankey. James R. appears in an uncredited cameo appearance, he would join the supporting cast in season eight.

Episodes

Webisodes

Check Yourself
Love & Hip Hop New York: Check Yourself, which features the cast's reactions to each episode, was released weekly with every episode on digital platforms.

Bonus scenes
Deleted scenes from the season's episodes were released weekly as bonus content on VH1's official website.

Music
Several cast members had their music featured on the show and released singles to coincide with the airing of the episodes.

References

External links

2016 American television seasons
2017 American television seasons
Love & Hip Hop